Lucchitta Glacier is a glacier about  long flowing south from the Hudson Mountains of Antarctica into Pine Island Bay. It was named by the Advisory Committee on Antarctic Names after geologist Baerbel K. Lucchitta of the United States Geological Survey, Flagstaff, Arizona, a specialist in the use of satellite imagery for geological and glaciological studies from the early 1980s to the early 2000s (decade), and one of the pioneers in the use of imagery for glacier velocity measurements in Antarctica.

See also
 List of glaciers in the Antarctic
 Glaciology

References

 

Hudson Mountains
Glaciers of Ellsworth Land